Plays Pretty Just for You is an album by American jazz organist Jimmy Smith featuring performances recorded in 1957 and released on the Blue Note label.

Reception
The Allmusic review awarded the album 3 stars.

Track listing
 "The Nearness of You" (Hoagy Carmichael, Ned Washington) – 5:44
 "The Jitterbug Waltz" (Fats Waller) – 4:57
 "East of the Sun" (Brooks Bowman) – 6:06
 "Autumn in New York" (Vernon Duke) – 4:24
 "Penthouse Serenade (When We're Alone)" (Val Burton, Will Jason) – 5:29
 "The Very Thought of You" (Ray Noble) – 4:29
 "I Can't Get Started" (Duke, Ira Gershwin) – 4:48
 "Old Devil Moon" (E. Y. Harburg, Burton Lane) – 5:42
Recorded at Manhattan Towers in New York City on May 8, 1957

Personnel

Musicians
 Jimmy Smith – organ
 Eddie McFadden – guitar
 Donald Bailey – drums

Technical
 Alfred Lion – producer
 Rudy Van Gelder – engineer
 Tom Hannan – design
 Francis Wolff – photography
 Leonard Feather – liner notes

References

Blue Note Records albums
Jimmy Smith (musician) albums
1957 albums
Albums produced by Alfred Lion